More Parts per Million is The Thermals' debut studio album. The album was released in 2003 on Sub Pop Records. Only $60 was spent on the recording and therefore the record has a very lo-fi aesthetic, not present on their later recordings.

Track listing

References

2003 debut albums
The Thermals albums
Sub Pop albums